Belmiro Braga is a city in the state of Minas Gerais, Brazil close to the border with Rio de Janeiro state. It was emancipated from Juiz de Fora in 1962. As of 2020, the estimated population was 3,425 inhabitants.

Geography

The municipality is located 295 km (by road) from the capital, Belo Horizonte.

Highways
BR-040
MG-353

Relief, climate, hydrography
The municipality is in the basin of the Paraíba do Sul river.

Demographics
Total Population : 3425
Urban: 950
Rural: 2477
Men: 1734
Women: 1693
(Source: AMM )
Population density (inhabitants per km²): 8.7
Infant mortality up to 1 year (per thousand): 24.1
Life expectancy (years): 71.6
Fertility rate (children per woman): 2.9
Literacy Rate : 83.4%

(Source: UNDP / 2000)

References

Municipalities in Minas Gerais